Harlem Heights is an unincorporated community and census-designated place (CDP) in Lee County, Florida, United States. The population was 1,930 at the 2020 census, down from 1,975 at the 2010 census. It is part of the Cape Coral-Fort Myers, Florida Metropolitan Statistical Area.

Geography
It is bordered to the west, across Pine Ridge Road, by the Iona CDP. Gladiolus Drive is the main east-west road across the community.

Demographics

As of the census of 2000, there were 1,065 people, 303 households, and 236 families residing in the CDP. The racial makeup of the CDP was 42.72% White, 36.06% African American, 0.38% Asian, 16.71% from other races, and 4.13% from two or more races. Hispanic or Latino of any race were 55.02% of the population.

There were 303 households, out of which 40.3% had children under the age of 18 living with them, 39.3% were married couples living together, 33.7% had a female householder with no husband present, and 22.1% were non-families. 16.8% of all households were made up of individuals, and 3.0% had someone living alone who was 65 years of age or older.  The average household size was 3.51 and the average family size was 3.92.

In the CDP, the population was spread out, with 33.6% under the age of 18, 10.3% from 18 to 24, 29.7% from 25 to 44, 18.5% from 45 to 64, and 7.9% who were 65 years of age or older.  The median age was 29 years. For every 100 females, there were 100.9 males.  For every 100 females age 18 and over, there were 91.6 males.

The median income for a household in the CDP was $28,611, and the median income for a family was $27,056. Males had a median income of $22,826 versus $20,000 for females. The per capita income for the CDP was $8,963.  About 27.4% of families and 27.5% of the population were below the poverty line, including 35.3% of those under age 18 and 18.2% of those age 65 or over.

References

Census-designated places in Lee County, Florida
Census-designated places in Florida